is a Japanese singer, actor and voice actor.

Filmography

Live-action films
Tora-san's Lullaby (1974) – Yatarō Ōkawa
Tora-san's Rise and Fall (1975) – A pirate
Death of a Tea Master (1989) – Yamanoue Sōji
The Mourner (2015)

Anime films
Porco Rosso (1992) – Mamma Aiuto Gang Boss
Princess Mononoke (1997) – Gonza
Doraemon: Nobita's Great Adventure in the South Seas (1998) – Mr. Cash
Spirited Away (2001) – Chichiyaku

Television dramas
Taiga drama series
Tokugawa Ieyasu (1983) – Torii Suneemon
Takeda Shingen (1988) – Murakami Yoshikiyo
Hideyoshi (1996) – Saitō Toshimitsu
Aoi Tokugawa Sandai (2000) – Uesugi Kagekatsu
Gunshi Kanbei (2014) – Ōtomo Sōrin
Kinpachi-sensei (1979–2011) – Hajime Hattori
GeGeGe no Nyōbō (2010) – Otomatsu Sugiura
Team Medical Dragon 4 (2014) – Nobuo Morimoto
Trick Shinsaku Special 3 (2014) – Kōzō Saeki

Tokusatsu
Space Sheriff Sharivan (1983–84) – Denichirō Iga
Daimajin Kanon (2010) – Bujin-sama (voice)

Stage
Man of La Mancha (1977–2005) – The Innkeeper
Fiddler on the Roof (1982–2005) – Lazar Wolf
My Fair Lady (1993–2007) – Alfred P. Doolittle
Twelfth Night (2003) – Malvolio
Cabaret (2004) – Herr Schultz
The Woman in White (2007) – Count Fosco
Zorro (2011) – Don Alejandro de la Vega

Dubbing
The Little Mermaid – Sebastian
The Front Page – Walter Burns (Walter Matthau)

Discography
 Ame yo Fure (1969)
 Tabidachi no Uta (1971)
 Dareka ga Kaze no Naka de (1972)
 chanter (1973)
 Sangosho ni nani wo mita (1973)
 Hashi (1973)
 Sayonara no Sekai (1974)

Kōhaku Uta Gassen appearances

Awards and prizes

References

External links
Official profile 

1968 births
Japanese male singers
Japanese male film actors
Japanese male television actors
Japanese male stage actors
Japanese male voice actors
Living people
Male voice actors from Nagano Prefecture
Musicians from Nagano Prefecture